Lothar Bolz (3 September 190328 December 1986) was an East German politician. From 1953 to 1965 he served as Minister of Foreign Affairs of East Germany (GDR).

Biography
Lothar Bolz was born in Gleiwitz in Upper Silesia, now Poland, on 3 September 1903. His father was a watchmaker.

He studied law at the universities of Breslau and Kiel. After his study he worked as a lawyer in Breslau In 1930, he joined the Communist Party of Germany. After the Nazis came to power in 1933 he was no longer allowed to work as a lawyer because of his political affiliation. Bolz went to Moscow, finding work as a teacher at the Marx-Engels Institute. From 1941 to 1945 he was headteacher of the anti-fascist school, which aimed to indoctrinate German prisoners of war  against fascism. During his stay in the Soviet Union, he became a Soviet citizen and retained dual citizenship. 

In 1947, he returned to Germany and joined the East German Socialist Unity Party, but in 1948 he founded the Communist-sponsored National Democratic Party of Germany (NDPD). Many members of the NDPD were former Nazis and former Wehrmacht officers. From 1948 to 1972 he was the chairman of the NDPD. In 1949 he became a member of the People's Chamber (Parliament) and from 1949 to 1953 he was the Minister of Construction. From 1950 to 1967 he was one of the Deputy Prime Ministers of the GDR. In 1953, being the successor of Foreign Minister Anton Ackermann. He stayed in the office until 1965. From 1950 to his death he was a member of the Presidium of the National Front. He also acted as the chairman of Society for German-Soviet Friendship from 1968 to 1978.

Bolz died on 28 December 1986 in East Berlin at the age of 83.

References

1903 births
1986 deaths
People from Gliwice
People from the Province of Silesia
Communist Party of Germany politicians
Socialist Unity Party of Germany politicians
National Democratic Party of Germany (East Germany) politicians
Foreign Ministers of East Germany
Members of the Provisional Volkskammer
Members of the 1st Volkskammer
Members of the 2nd Volkskammer
Members of the 3rd Volkskammer
Members of the 4th Volkskammer
Members of the 5th Volkskammer
Members of the 6th Volkskammer
Members of the 7th Volkskammer
Members of the 8th Volkskammer
Refugees from Nazi Germany in the Soviet Union
National Committee for a Free Germany members
Recipients of the Patriotic Order of Merit (honor clasp)
Recipients of the Banner of Labor
Commanders of the Order of Polonia Restituta